Passanant i Belltall is a municipality in the comarca of the Conca de Barberà in Catalonia, Spain.

It includes the settlements of Passanant, Belltall, Glorieta, La Sala de Comalats, La Pobla de Ferran and El Fonoll.

The municipality was known as Passanant until 2005 when it was changed because although the town hall remains in Passanant, the village of Belltall is also of importance.

References

 Panareda Clopés, Josep Maria; Rios Calvet, Jaume; Rabella Vives, Josep Maria (1989). Guia de Catalunya, Barcelona: Caixa de Catalunya.  (Spanish).  (Catalan).

External links 
Official website 
 Government data pages 

Municipalities in Conca de Barberà